Joseph Warren Scott (November 21, 1778 – April 27, 1871) Colonel in U.S. Army who lived in New Brunswick, New Jersey.

He was born to Moses Scott, the senior surgeon during the US Revolutionary War. Moses named Joseph Warren Scott I, for his friend Joseph Warren who died during the Battle of Bunker Hill. Joseph graduated from Princeton University in 1795, then married Jane Griffiths (c1780-1821) and had a daughter: Lavinia Agnes Scott, who married Richard Varick Dey. Joseph obtained a law degree, and, in 1821, he bought "The White House" in New Brunswick, New Jersey and named it Buccleuch.

In 1808, he was a Captain in the Middlesex Regiment and served in the War of 1812. In 1829, he was promoted to Colonel. He was the oldest member of the New Jersey bar when he died in New Brunswick at the age of 93.

Timeline
1778 Birth
1795 Graduates from Princeton University
1808 Captain in Middlesex Regiment
1810 Founded Bank of New Brunswick
1821 Buys "The White House" in New Brunswick from Mary Garnett and renames it "Buccleuch" on June 6
1824 Enters Jerusalem Masonic Lodge #40 in Plainfield, New Jersey on June 7
1825 Starts Cranbury Lodge #47 and Rahway Lodge #49
1827 Becomes Master Mason
1829 Promoted to Colonel
1830 Deputy Masonic Grand Master
1831 Begins Masonic Grand Master
1834 Ends Masonic Grand Master
1834 Marriage of Cornelia D. Scott, his daughter, to John David Ogilby (c1810-1851) on April 30
1837 Possible gubernatorial candidate
1850 Revitalizes Union Lodge #12 in New Brunswick, New Jersey as Union Lodge #19 on March 12
1871 Death on April 27
1871 Funeral on May 4

References
A.D. Jewett; Address delivered at the funeral of Joseph Warren Scott, May 4, 1871. Published by the American Whig Society of Princeton, New Jersey (1871)
Everett R Turnbull, Ray V Denslow; A History of Royal Arch Masonry Part Two 
Francis Bazley Lee; New Jersey as a Colony and as a State: One of the Original Thirteen

1778 births
1871 deaths
Princeton University alumni
United States Army officers
People from New Brunswick, New Jersey
Military personnel from New Jersey